Shweta Mohan (born 19 November 1985) is an Indian playback singer. She has received four Filmfare Awards South for Best Female Playback Singer, one Kerala State Film Award and one Tamil Nadu State Film Award. She has recorded more than 700
songs and albums in all the four south Indian languages namely Malayalam, Tamil, Telugu, Kannada, she has also recorded songs for Hindi films and has established herself as a leading playback singer of South Indian cinema.

Personal life 
Shweta Mohan was born on 19 November 1985 to a Malayali family in Chennai, Tamil Nadu. She is the daughter of Krishna Mohan and playback singer Sujatha Mohan. She completed her schooling at Good Shepherd Convent, Chennai and graduated from Stella Maris College, Chennai. She is married to her long-time friend, Ashwin Shashi. Shweta Mohan and Ashwin Shashi have a daughter, Sreshta Ashwin, who was born in 2017.

Career 
Shweta started her training in Carnatic music at the age of 9. As a child artiste, she recorded for the chorus of the songs 'Kuchi kuchi rakkamma' (Bombay) and 'Accham accham illai' (Indira) in the music direction of A. R. Rahman. Shweta has sung for music directors in India like Ilayaraja, A. R. Rahman, Vidyasagar, M M Keeravani, M. Jayachandran, Johnson, Sharreth, Ousepachan, Deepak Dev, Harris Jayaraj, Yuvan Shankar Raja,   V. Harikrishna, G. V. Prakash, Mani Sharma, Kannan, N. R. Raghunanthan, Manikanth Kadri, Devi Sri Prasad and Anirudh Ravichander.  Shweta is being trained in Carnatic classical vocal currently under Binni Krishnakumar who is also a playback singer.

Discography

Awards and Nominations received by Shweta Mohan

Television

References

External links
 
 
 

1985 births
Living people
21st-century Indian singers
21st-century Indian women singers
Indian pop singers
Indian women pop singers
Indian women playback singers
Singers from Chennai
Kerala State Film Award winners
Tamil playback singers
Malayalam playback singers
Kannada playback singers
Filmfare Awards South winners
Stella Maris College, Chennai alumni
Women musicians from Tamil Nadu